Judy Koehler (born September 20, 1941) is an American politician who served as a Republican member of the Illinois House of Representatives and Illinois Appellate Court Justice.

Illinois House of Representatives
Koehler was first elected to the Illinois House of Representatives in 1980, defeating incumbent Representative Donald Anderson in the Republican primary. Koehler received the most votes in the primary, in which the two candidates receiving the most votes were nominated. Koehler also received the most votes in the general election, in which the three candidates receiving the most votes were elected.

Koehler first represented the 45th district, but after the Cutback Amendment was redistricted into the 89th district with fellow incumbent Republican Representative John "Jay" Ackerman. The 89th district included all or parts of Marshall, McLean, Stark, Tazewell, and Woodford counties in north-central Illinois. Koehler defeated Ackerman by a wide margin. In the general election, Koehler defeated Democrat Mike McNally by more than a 3 to 1 margin. Koehler was unopposed in the 1984 general election. Koehler served as Representative for the 89th district until 1987. Koehler's district was based in north-central Illinois.

Koehler opposed the $8,000 a year pay raise that the legislature voted to give itself in a lame-duck session in 1978, and returned $8,000 of her pay to the state treasury every year she was in office, returning a total of $48,000 over her 6 years in office.

1986 United States Senate election
In 1986, Koehler ran for the United States Senate. Koehler defeated Inland Steel executive George Ranneywik in the Republican primary, but was unable to oust incumbent Alan Dixon in the general election. She was succeeded in the Illinois House of Representatives by John "Jay" Ackerman, who she had defeated in the 1982 Republican primary for the seat.

Later career
In 1992, a graduate of Loyola University Chicago School of Law, Koehler was admitted to the Illinois State Bar. Koehler served as an assistant DuPage County state's attorney. In 1994, Koehler ran for U.S. Congress in Illinois's 18th congressional district to replace the retiring Republican Robert H. Michel. Koehler lost in the primary to Michel's Chief of Staff and endorsed successor Ray LaHood.

Following her run for Congress, Koehler became senior legislative counsel of Americans United for Life. In May 1998, Judy Koehler was appointed to the Illinois Appellate Court by Illinois Supreme Court Justice James Heiple, to fill the vacancy of Michael McCuskey, who had become a federal judge. Koehler narrowly lost in her bid for election to the 3rd district Appellate Court Seat in 2000 to Democrat Mary McDade.

Electoral history 
 Illinois House of Representatives District 45 Republican primary, 1980
 Judy Koehler, 40,481, 52%
 John "Jay" Ackerman, 22,654, 29%
 Donald Anderson, 14,266, 18%
 Illinois House of Representatives District 45 election, 1980
 Judy Koehler (R), 92,386, 36%
 John "Jay" Ackerman (R), 77,403, 30%
 Joe Ozella, Jr. (D), 51,823, 20%
 Bernice Jackson (D), 36,946, 14%
 Illinois House of Representatives District 89 Republican primary, 1982
 Judy Koehler, 9,561, 72%
 John "Jay" Ackerman, 3,642, 28%
 Illinois House of Representatives District 89 election, 1982
 Judy Koehler (R), 25,393, 76%
 Mike McNally (D), 8,105, 24%
 Illinois House of Representatives District 89 election, 1984
 Judy Koehler (R), 127,475, 100%
 Republican primary for United States Senate in Illinois, 1986
 Judy Koehler, 266,214, 55%
 George Ranney, 217,720, 45%
 United States Senate election in Illinois, 1986
 Alan Dixon (D), 2,033,783, 65%
 Judy Koehler (R), 1,053,734, 34%
 Illinois's 18th congressional district Republican primary, 1994
 Ray LaHood, 33,956, 50%
 Judy Koehler, 26,809, 40%
 Dennis Lee Higgins, 6,959, 10%
 3rd District Appellate Court Republican primary, 2000
 Judy Koehler, 34,945, 34%
 Karen L. Kendall, 33,981, 33%
 Michael L. Closen, 33,981, 33%
 3rd District Appellate Court election, 2000
 Mary McDade (D), 318,151, 51%
 Judy Koehler (R), 301,751, 49%

References

1941 births
Judges of the Illinois Appellate Court
Living people
Republican Party members of the Illinois House of Representatives
Women state legislators in Illinois
21st-century American women
20th-century American politicians
20th-century American women politicians
20th-century American judges
20th-century American women judges
Candidates in the 1986 United States elections
Candidates in the 1994 United States elections
People from Adams County, Illinois
Western Illinois University alumni
Loyola University Chicago School of Law alumni